Dunlap Methodist Episcopal Church is a historic church in Brule County, South Dakota, located 12 miles north of Platte, South Dakota. It was built in 1902 and was added to the National Register in 2001.

It is a wood-frame church on a stone foundation.

The Dunlap cemetery, deemed contributing, was established at approximately the same time as the church.  It includes gravestones dating from 1893 to 2001.

The church was deemed notable "as a well-preserved example of simplified vernacular gothic architectural style and represents the first generation church construction in the eastern portion of the state."

References

Methodist churches in South Dakota
Churches on the National Register of Historic Places in South Dakota
Gothic Revival church buildings in South Dakota
Churches completed in 1902
Churches in Brule County, South Dakota
National Register of Historic Places in Brule County, South Dakota